The Panama women's national under-20 football team is the national U-20 women's football team of Panama and is managed by the Panamanian Football Federation. The U-20 team represents Panama in the CONCACAF Women's U-20 Championship and FIFA U-20 Women's World Cup

Players
The following squad were announced recently ended 2023 UNCAF Women's U-20 Championship.

Fixtures and results
Legend

2022

2023

Competitive records

FIFA U-20 Women's World Cup

CONCACAF Women's U-20 Championship

References

Central American national under-20 association football teams
Women's football in Panama
Central American women's national under-20 association football teams
Football